The Hays-Kiser House is a historic house in Antioch, Tennessee, U.S.. It was built in 1795 for Charles Hays, a settler from North Carolina. It has been listed on the National Register of Historic Places since September 10, 1974.

References

Houses on the National Register of Historic Places in Tennessee
Federal architecture in Tennessee
Houses completed in 1795
Buildings and structures in Davidson County, Tennessee